Statistics of Emperor's Cup in the 1975 season.

Overview
It was contested by 26 teams, and Hitachi won the championship.

Results

1st round
Nippon Kokan 2–0 Waseda University
Tanabe Pharmaceuticals 1–3 Eidai Industries
Osaka University of Health and Sport Sciences 1–2 Chuo University
Yamaha Motors 2–0 Hosei University
Kyushu Sangyo University 1–0 NTT Kinki
Hakodate Soccer 0–6 Chuo University
Mitsubishi Oil 0–1 Teijin Matsuyama
Nissei Resin Industry 1–3 Meiji University
Toyota Motors 2–2 (PK 5–4) Osaka University of Commerce
Nippon Steel Kamaishi 0–4 Fujita Industries

2nd round
Nippon Kokan 1–1 (PK 2–3) Eidai Industries
Chuo University 0–3 Hitachi
Nippon Steel 2–1 Yamaha Motors
Kyushu Sangyo University 0–4 Yanmar Diesel
Mitsubishi Motors 1–0 Chuo University
Teijin Matsuyama 0–2 Toyo Industries
Furukawa Electric 3–1 Meiji University
Toyota Motors 0–1 Fujita Industries

Quarterfinals
Eidai Industries 0–1 Hitachi
Nippon Steel 0–2 Yanmar Diesel
Mitsubishi Motors 2–1 Toyo Industries
Furukawa Electric 1–2 Fujita Industries

Semifinals
Hitachi 1–0 Yanmar Diesel
Mitsubishi Motors 0–1 Fujita Industries

Final

Hitachi 2–0 Fujita Industries
Hitachi won the championship.

References
 NHK

Emperor's Cup
Emperor's Cup
1976 in Japanese football